The Battle of Formentara occurred on 28 October 1529 when an Ottoman fleet under Aydın Reis routed a small Spanish fleet of eight galleys off the island of Formentera near Ibiza.

Habsburg emperor Charles V had sent a small Spanish fleet of eight galleys under the Spanish commander of the Castilla fleet, Rodrigo Portuondo, to eliminate Barbary ships from Algiers under Caccia Diavolo which were raiding the coast of Valencia and ferrying Moriscos from Spain to Algeria.

Portuondo was killed in the battle, seven of his eight galleys were captured, and his soldiers were taken as slaves to the recently conquered city of Algiers.

Notes

References
 Garnier, Edith L'Alliance Impie Editions du Felin, 2008, Paris  Interview

1529 in the Ottoman Empire
Formentera 1529
Suleiman the Magnificent
Formentera
Formentera 1529
Formentera 1529
1520s in Spain
Formentera 1529
Formentera